This National Reining Horse Association Hall of Fame was created by the National Reining Horse Association (NRHA) for the Hall of Fame to recognize extraordinary athletes, both human and equine, in the sport of Reining. It was founded in 1986 to honor and distinguish these individuals. Since the inception of the organization, both people and equine have contributed to its growth. The NRHA considers all of these individuals contributions exceptional to this sport. The Reining Horse Foundation instituted this hall of fame to continually acknowledge these individuals, and their display is a permanent exhibit which can be visited at the NHRA headquarters in Oklahoma City, Oklahoma.

 Awarded in a previous year

Inductees

Equine inductees 

Source:

People inductees 

Source:

NRHA Dale Wilkinson Lifetime Achievement Award 

Source:

Million dollar earners

Million dollar riders

2019 Dean Brown

Million dollar dams

2019 Dun It For Chex

Million dollar sires
 2019 Cromed Out Mercedes
 2019 Spat Olena
 2019 Big Chex To Cash

Two million dollar sires
 2019 Hollywoodstinseltown
 2019 Spooks Gotta Whiz

Three million dollar sires
2019 Gunners Special Nite

Four million dollar sires
2019 Smart Like Juice

Six million dollar sires
 2019 Magnum Chic Dream
 2019 Smart Spook

Seven million dollar sires
Smart Chick Olena

Eleven million dollar sires
 2019 Gunner
 2019 Wimpys Little Step

Source

See also
 Campdrafting
 Cutting (sport)
 Horse show
 National Reining Horse Association
 National Reining Horse Association Champions and Awards
 National Reined Cow Horse Association
 National Reined Cow Horse Association Champions
 National Reined Cow Horse Association Hall of Fame
 Ranch sorting
 Reining
 Stock horse
 Team penning
 Western riding
 Western saddle

References

External links
 Official Site
 What is Reined Cow Horse aka Working Cow Horse (Photos & Video)

Equestrian organizations
Reining
Western-style riding
Equestrianism
Cowboy halls of fame
Halls of fame in Oklahoma
Sports halls of fame